Malaucène is a commune in the Vaucluse department in the Provence-Alpes-Côte d'Azur region in southeastern France.

Geography
Malaucène is a typical provençal village located in Provence (South of France) at the foot of Mont Ventoux.

Sights
The village itself dates from the tenth century. It features Medieval, Gallic and Roman structures (even prehistoric vestiges). The best views are on top of the Calvaire located in the middle of the older part of town.

Economy
There is an outside market every Wednesday morning. Local merchants sell olives, salamis, potteries, handicrafts, clothes, etc. Malaucène has several restaurants, cafés, and wineries. Several places exhibit local artists, especially painters.

See also
 Dentelles de Montmirail
Communes of the Vaucluse department

References

External links

 Town of Malaucène official website 

Communes of Vaucluse